Billy Highstreet Samba is an album by saxophonist Stan Getz which was recorded in Paris in 1981 and released on the EmArcy label in 1990.

Reception

The Allmusic review by Scott Yanow stated "Not essential music but a fine example of Getz's flexibility and creative instincts".

Track listing
 "Hospitality Creek" (Mitchel Forman) - 9:49
 "Anytime Tomorrow" (Chuck Loeb) - 6:02
 "Be There Then" (Loeb) - 8:10
 "Billy Highstreet Samba" (Loeb) - 6:01
 "The Dirge" (Forman) - 7:04
 "Page Two" (Loeb) - 8:59
 "Body and Soul" (Johnny Green, Frank Eyton, Edward Heyman, Robert Sour) - 6:27
 "Tuesday Next" (Loeb) - 10:06 (CD Bonus Track)

Personnel 
Stan Getz - tenor saxophone, soprano saxophone
Mitchel Forman - keyboards
Chuck Loeb - guitar
Mark Egan - electric bass
Victor Lewis - drums
Bobby Thomas - percussion

References 

1990 albums
Stan Getz albums
EmArcy Records albums